Callisto pfaffenzelleri is a moth of the family Gracillariidae. It is known from the Alps and Slovenia.

The larvae feed on Amelanchier, Cotoneaster integerrimus, and Sorbus species. They mine the leaves of their host plant. The mine starts near the leaf margin. From there, it develops into a small lower-surface tentiform mine with only weak folds. Older larvae live freely under a leaf margin that has been folded upwards, sometimes also between spun leaves.

References

Gracillariinae
Moths of Europe
Moths described in 1856